Uchqizil is an urban-type settlement in Surxondaryo Region, Uzbekistan. It is the administrative center of Termiz District. Its population was 3,408 people in 1989, and 3,700 in 2016.

References

Populated places in Surxondaryo Region
Urban-type settlements in Uzbekistan